She's a Riot is the second extended play by Australian indie rock band The Jungle Giants, released independently on 27 July 2012.

Lead singer Sam Hales said the songs reflected a time in his life when he experienced love for the first time, saying: "I've had good and bad experiences in relationships and it's good to draw from both the good and the bad."

Critical reception
Stephen Rae from Music Feeds said that despite being new to the music scene, "[the Jungle Giants] have asserted themselves as real up-and-comers amidst an ever-growing scene." He added: "As a band that may be still finding their feet but are more than capable of producing some top quality in the process."

Antigone Anagnostellis from Purple Sneakers said: "[the Jungle Giants] down-to-earth lyrics and solid arrangements are reminiscent of an early Kooks or Jinja Safari. You can tell these guys were friends in high school – their musical talents fit well together."

Charley Rico from The Courier-Mail said the EP is full of "catchy riffs and full of pop-driven melodies".

Track listing

Charts

Certifications

Release history

References

2012 EPs
The Jungle Giants EPs